The Payson Center for International Development at Tulane University in New Orleans, Louisiana, United States, was an interdisciplinary center for the study of international development.

Degrees conferred

The Payson Center conferred the following major and degrees:
 Undergraduate major in international development
 Master of Science
 Joint Juris Doctor and Master of Science
 Master of Laws (LLM) in Development
 Doctorate

History

The Payson Center was founded in 1998 by William E. Bertrand and Eamon Kelly as the Payson School for International Development and Technology Transfer, with a focus on information and communication technology in international development. Up until 2007 Payson maintained an office in Arlington, VA.

In 2008 it was reorganized as part of the Tulane Law School, which at the time was a unique affiliation. In 2015, the Center underwent another restructuring and no longer exists as a functioning entity.

References

External links
 Payson Center for International Development website
 Tulane Hullabaloo website

Tulane University
Tulane University Law School
Development studies